BCB can mean:

Government, politics, & industry
 Central Bolívar Bloc, a Colombian paramilitary organization known by the Spanish initials BCB
 Bauer College of Business, an academic college at the University of Houston
 Board Certified in Biofeedback, a certification administered by the Biofeedback Certification Institute of America
 Banco Central do Brasil (Central Bank of Brazil), a state-owned bank and principal monetary authority

Science
 Benzocyclobutene, a polycyclic aromatic hydrocarbon
 Brilliant cresyl blue, a supravital stain

Sport
 Bangladesh Cricket Board, the main governing body on Cricket in Bangladesh
 Border City Brawlers, roller derby league from Windsor, Ontario
 Bermuda Cricket Board, the main governing body on Cricket in Bermuda.

Technology
 Borland C++ Builder, a popular rapid application development (RAD) environment

Transport
 Burscough Bridge railway station, the National Rail station designated BCB
 BCB, the IATA airport code for the Virginia Tech Montgomery Executive Airport in Blacksburg, Virginia